The Connecticut Convention Center is a convention center located in downtown Hartford, Connecticut, United States, overlooking the Connecticut River.

History

The center opened on June 2 2005. It is the largest convention facility between New York and Boston. The Connecticut Convention Center’s  glass atrium rises ten stories above a grand public plaza and a tree-lined riverfront esplanade.

The Connecticut Convention Center has been home to ConnectiCon since 2005.

See also

List of convention centers in the United States

References

External links

Convention centers in Connecticut
Tourist attractions in Hartford, Connecticut
Buildings and structures in Hartford, Connecticut